Tortyra aurofasciana is a moth of the family Choreutidae. It is known from the West Indies.

References

Tortyra
Moths described in 1875